Live at Stubb's, Vol. 2 is the third live album by Matisyahu. The album is a sequel to his debut live album. It was recorded live at Stubb's in Austin, Texas on August 18, 2010, and mixed by Joel Hamilton.

Critical reception
AllMusic awarded the album 3.5 out of 5 stars, with writer David Jeffries viewing it as a stronger album than the first volume.

Track listing
"Kodesh" – 11:03
"Time of Your Song" – 4:45
"Mist Rising" – 5:32
"Darkness Into Light" – 6:13
"Youth" – 12:27
"I Will Be Light" – 6:39
"Two Child One Drop" – 11:26
"Open the Gates" – 8:21
"One Day" – 7:06
"Motivate" – 5:27

Charts

References

Matisyahu albums
2011 live albums